Dhadi may refer to :

 Dhadi (music), a genre of folk ballads from Punjab, India
 Dhadi (caste), a subgroup of the Mirasi of Punjab, India, traditionally performers of the dhadi ballads
 Dhadi State, a former hill state of India, located in the Simla Hills

See also 
 Dadhi